Bruno Miguel Mendes Alves (born 9 June 1990 in Guimarães) is a Portuguese professional footballer who plays for Pevidém S.C. as a midfielder.

References

External links

1990 births
Living people
Sportspeople from Guimarães
Portuguese footballers
Association football midfielders
Primeira Liga players
Liga Portugal 2 players
Segunda Divisão players
Vitória S.C. B players
Vitória S.C. players
Amarante F.C. players
A.D. Lousada players
C.D. Aves players
F.C. Arouca players
C.D. Fátima players
C.D. Cova da Piedade players
AD Fafe players
Pevidém S.C. players